The High Sheriff of Meath was the British Crown's judicial representative in County Meath, Ireland, from the conquest until 1922, when the office was abolished in the new Free State and replaced by the office of Meath County Sheriff.

The sheriff had judicial, electoral, ceremonial and administrative functions and executed high court writs. In 1908, an Order in Council made the Lord-Lieutenant the Sovereign's prime representative in a county and reduced the High Sheriff's precedence. However, the sheriff retained his responsibilities for the preservation of law and order in the county. The usual procedure for appointing the sheriff from 1660 onwards was that three persons were nominated at the beginning of each year from the county and the Lord Lieutenant then appointed his choice as High Sheriff for the remainder of the year. Often the other nominees were appointed as under-sheriffs.

Sometimes a sheriff did not fulfil his entire term through death or other event and another sheriff was then appointed for the remainder of the year. The dates given hereunder are the dates of appointment. All addresses are in County Meath unless stated otherwise.

High Sheriffs of County Meath
1299 Rythery Fitzjohn 
1340: Michael Stokes
1345: Roger Dardis 
1346: Sir Walter de la Hyde (murdered that year?)
1368: John FitzRichard
1373: William Dalton (killed by the Cenal-Fiachaidh)
1384 Walter Chaumbre
1385: Richard Drake of Drakerath
1386: John Darcy 
1401: Sir William Nugent of Balrath
1403: Sir Christopher Plunket 
1404: Sir John D'Arcy
1405: Sir William Nugent of Balrath, second term 
1406: Matthew Hussey of Moyle-Hussey 
1408: Matthew  Hussey of Moyle-Hussey, second term 
1409:  Sir Christopher Plunket,  second term
1415: Sir John D'Arcy
1422 John Drake
1424: Richard Nugent, 2nd Baron Delvin
1425:  Sir Christopher Plunket, third term 
1435: John Barnewall
1470: Robert Bold, Baron Ratoath
1472: James Fleming, 7th Baron Slane
1482 Alexander Plunket

Henry VIII 1509–1547
1510: Christopher Cusack of Gerardstown 
1520–1521: Nicholas Hussey, 10th Baron Galtrim
1542: James Everard
1543: Sir Thomas Cusack, Lord Chancellor of Ireland

Elizabeth I, 1558–1603
1598: Richard Brett

James I, 1603–1625
1610: Patrick Barnewall of Trim
1613: Patrick Barnewall of Trim
1622: Patrick Barnewall of Trim

Charles I, 1625–1649
1627 Patrick Segrave

Commonwealth, 1649–1660
1658: William Cadogan

Charles II, 1660–1685

1661: Hercules Langford
1667: Richard Janns of Blackcastle
1669: Henry Wade of Clonabreany
1670: George Pepper of Ballygarth  
1671: James Naper  
1677: Sir Hercules Langford, 1st Baronet
1678: Charles Meredyth
1679: Arthur Meredyth
1682: Arthur Meredyth

James II, 1685–1688
1686: Launcelot Dowdall of Mounttown 
1686: Donogh Mac Gillicuddy.
1688: John Browne.

William III, 1689–1702

1690: Sir Henry Langford, 3rd Baronet
1698: Joseph Pratt
1700: Henry Cadogan
1702: James Naper of Loughcrew

George I, 1714–1727
1720: Robert Waller
1724: George Pepper of Ballygarth  
1725: John Coddington

George II, 1727–1760
1727:
1728:
1729:
1730: James Garstin of Leragh Castle
1731:
1732:
1733: Benjamin Chapman of St Lucy's, Co. Westmeath 
1734: Richard Wesley, 1st Baron Mornington
1735: Christopher Nicholson of Balrath Burry  
1736:
1737: Clotworthy Sheilds Wade of Clonebrayney
1738: Hercules Langford Rowley of Summerhill House
1739:
1740: James Lenox Naper of Loughcrew 
1741:
1742: James Fleming 
1743: Sir Quaile Somerville, 2nd Baronet
1744:
1745:
1746:
1747:
1748: John Wade
1749:
1750: William Waller of Allenstown House
1751:
1752:
1753: John Graham
1754: Dixie Coddington of Oldbridge
1755:
1756:
1757:
1758:
1759:

George III, 1760–1820
1760:
1766: Richard Hamilton, 4th Viscount Boyne
1767:
1770: Hamilton Gorges of Kilbrew
1772: Robert Wade of Clonebraney
1774: Gustavus Hamilton, 5th Viscount Boyne
1775:
1778: Samuel Winter of Agher  
1779:
1781: Michael Tisdall (1755–1794) of Charles Fort near Kells
1782: Thomas Ash of Ashfield
1783: Sir John Meredyth, 1st Baronet, Kt of Carlandstown
1784: Richard Chaloner of King's Fort
1785: Henry Coddington
1786: Thomas Taylour, Marquess of Headfort
1787:
1788: Michael Tisdall of Charlesfort 
1789:
1791: Christopher Armytage Nicholson of Balrath Burry 
1792:
1794: Thomas Rothwell of Rockfield  
1795: Thomas Everard
1796: Hon. Clotworthy Taylour, later Rowley (cr. Baron Langford of Summerhill, Co. Meath in 1800; Surname legally changed to Rowley, 26 April 1796) 
1798: Nicholas Coddington
1800: Charles Drake Dillon
1802: Thomas Pepper of Ballygarth Castle  
1803: James O'Reilly of Baltrasna
1804: William Battersby
1805: Thomas Taylor Rowley
1806: John Pratt Winter of Agher 
1807: Thomas Barnes
1808: Henry Woodward
1809: Arthur Hill Cornwallis Pollock of Mountainstown
1810: Claudius Cole Hamilton
1811: Charles Arthur Tisdall of Charlesfort
1812: William Blaney Wade
1813: George Pepper of Ballygarth Castle
1814: Caleb Barnes
1815: Thomas Lowther Allen
1816: James Somerville
1817: Ferdinand Meath M'Veagh
1818: John Gerrard
1819: Henry Jeremiah Smith
1820: William Henry Waller

George IV, 1820–1830
1821: John Payne Garnett of Arch Hall, Navan
1822: James Lenox William Naper of Loughcrew
1823: Francis Singleton
1824: John Charles Preston, of Swainstown
1825: John Thompson, of Rathnally, Trim
1827: John Armytage Nicholson of Balrath Burry, Kells
1828: Robert George Bomford and Richard Bolton
1829: Anthony Blackburne of Parsonstown

William IV, 1830–1837
1831: The Honourable Edward Anthony John Preston of Gormanston Castle, Balbriggan 
1832: Robert George Bomford
1834: Hon. Randle E. Plunket of Dunsany Castle, Dunshaughlin
1836: Henry Meredyth, later Sir Henry Meredyth, 4th Baronet of North Dublin
1837: Samuel Winter of Agher

Victoria, 1837–1901
1838:
1839: Richard Rothwell, of Rockfield 
1840: Robert Craven Wade of Clonebraney  
1841: John Tisdall of Charlesfort
1842: Henry Corbet Singleton of Aclare  
1843: Henry Barry Coddington of Oldbridge 
1843: John Farrell of Moynalty 
1844: Thomas Taylour, 3rd Marquess of Headfort of Headfort House, Kells
1845: Lord Killeen, of Killeen Castle
1846: George Annesley Pollock of Oatlands  
1847:
1848: Henry Barry Coddington of Old Bridge, Drogheda
1849: William Martley Blackburne, of Tankardstown-Hall, Slane
1850: Michael Thunder of Lagore, Dunshaughlin
1851: Hans Hamilton Woods of Whitestown House  
1852: Edward Rotheram of Crossdrum  
1853: James Lenox Naper of Loughcrew  
1854: John Osborne George Pollock of Mountainstown  
1855: Richard Chaloner of King's Fort 
1856: Christopher A. Nicholson of Belrath, Kells  
1857: John Arthur Farrell of Moynalty 
1858: Samuel Garnett of Arch Hall, Navan
1859: Hercules Langford Boyle Rowley of Marlay Grange, Co. Dublin  
1860: George Bomford of Oakley Park 
1861:
1862: Thomas Boylan, Hilltown, Drogheda.
1863: Thomas Gerrard of Gibbstown and Boyne Hill.
1864: William Stawell Garnett of Williamston.
1865:
1867: Thomas Rockwell of Rockfield.
1868: 
1870: The Hon Jenico W. J. Preston of Gormanstown Castle, Balbriggan.
1871: Robert Fowler
1872: James Sanderson Winter of Agher.
1873: Robert Caddell of Harbourstown.
1874:
1875: Mervyn Pratt.
1876:
1877: Henry Corbet Singleton of Aclare.
1878: George Augustus Rotheram of Kilbride Castle, Trim.
1879:
1880: William Newcombe Waller of Allenstown.
1881: John Kearney
1882: Robert Grimshaw Dunville
1883: Nugent Talbot Everard, Bt
1884: John Naper George Pollock of Mountainstown.
1885: Edward Rotheram of Crossdrum.
1886:
1887: Charles Pepper of Ballygarth Castle.
1888: Edward Hamilton Woods of Milverton Hall, Co. Dublin.
1889: Nathaniel Hone Dyas of Athboy House & Staholmack, Co Meath.
1890:
1891: George Joseph Brooke McVeagh of Drewstown, Kells.
1892: Robert Bernard George Ashurst Gradwell
1893: Uvedale Corbet Singleton of Aclare.
1894: Thomas Boylan
1895: John Hampden Nicholson of Balrath Burry.
1896: William Thompson of Rathnally.
1897: Gustavus Villiers Briscoe of Bellinter House.
1898: Francis William Blackburne of Tankardstown.
1899: Robert Henry Fowler of Rahinston and Rathmolyon.
1900:
1901: Gustavus Francis William Lambart, 1st Baronet of Beau Parc.

Edward VII, 1901–1910
1902: Charles Henry Bulwer Caldwell of New Grange.
1904: Frederick Arthur Bligh of Brittas, Nobber.
1905: Fitzhenry Augustus Smith of Annesbrook, Duleek.
1906: Edward Rotheram of Crossdrum.
1907: John Edward Joseph Farrell of Moynalty.
1908: George Fitzgerald Murphy of the Grange, Dunsany.

George V, 1910–1936
1910: Patrick James Kennedy of Rathcore House, Enfield.
1911: William Lennox Naper of Loughcrew.
1912: Reginald Dashwood Tandy.
1913: John Francis Hevey Langan.
1922: Arthur Francis Coddington.

References

 
Meath
History of County Meath